Oculina is a genus of colonial stony coral in the family Oculinidae. These corals are mostly found in the Caribbean Sea, the Gulf of Mexico and Bermuda but some species occur in the eastern Pacific Ocean. They occur at depths down to 1000 metres.

Description
The colonies of Oculina have a straggly branching structure and are mostly pale yellow. The branches are slim, not exceeding  in diameter. The corallites which house the polyps are widely separated. Their walls are composed of fragile, solid-walled tubes. Each corallite has 12 primary septa with fine teeth which partially project from the corallite wall and which are larger than the intermediate septa. Some species contain symbiotic microalgae called zooxanthellae.

Species
The World Register of Marine Species lists the following species:
 Oculina arbuscula Agassiz, 1864
 Oculina diffusa Lamarck, 1816 - zooxanthellate
 †Oculina halensis Duncan, 1864 
 Oculina patagonica de Angelis, 1908 - zooxanthellate
 Oculina profunda Cairns, 1991
 Oculina robusta Pourtalès, 1871 Robust ivory tree coral - zooxanthellate
 Oculina tenella Pourtalès, 1871
 †Oculina umbellata Dennant, 1904 
 Oculina valenciennesi Milne Edwards & Haime, 1850 - zooxanthellate
 Oculina varicosa Lesueur, 1821 Ivory bush coral - zooxanthellate
 Oculina virgosa Squires, 1958

References

Oculinidae
Taxa named by Jean-Baptiste Lamarck
Scleractinia genera